The Spirit of Speyside Whisky Festival is held annually, normally over the first weekend of May. The festival celebrates malt whisky with a series of whisky inspired events across Speyside, Scotland. It started in 2000.

In 2006 the Spirit of Speyside Whisky Festival Ltd, a not for profit company, limited by guarantee, was incorporated to run the festival. The festival was held virtually in 2021.

See also
 Speyside Single Malts

References

External links
 Official website

Festivals in Scotland